Jarmoliński, feminine: Jarmolińska  is a  Polish-language surname. The East-Slavic equivalent is Yarmolinsky. Notable people with this surname include:

 Stanisław Jarmoliński (born 1944), Polish politician and physician
 Aleksandra Jarmolińska (born 1990), Polish sports shooter

Polish-language surnames